Uncisudis posteropelvis is a species of barracudina. It is found in the Western North Pacific Ocean.

Size

References 

Paralepididae
Taxa named by Atsushi Fukui
Taxa named by Takakazu Ozawa
Fish described in 2004